Ashley Tesoro (born Ashley Lyn Cafagna; February 15, 1983) is an American actress and singer. She is known for her starring roles in NBC's Saved by the Bell: The New Class (as Liz Miller) and CBS's The Bold and the Beautiful (as Kimberly Fairchild). In 2007, she released a self-titled country music EP. In 2010 she released a country gospel EP titled Oh You Angel. In 2012, she released a gospel EP titled Simply Worship.

Early life
Ashley Lyn Cafagna was born in Iowa City, Iowa, the first of three children. She was raised in Escondido, California. At the age of six she began entering beauty pageants, and won several local pageants from ages six through eight. She was crowned "Little Miss California" at the age of eight. She then started acting in a theater company called Christian Youth Theater. At the age of ten she entered a local talent contest in San Diego, California. After a long process of acting, modeling, and interviews, she took first place out of three hundred contestants. Her win placed her with an acting agent and manager.

Career

Acting
As a television actress Ashley Tesoro has appeared in NBC's Saved by the Bell: The New Class (as Liz Miller) for three seasons and CBS's The Bold and the Beautiful (as Kimberly Fairchild) for three years. She has had other roles in 7th Heaven, Valley of the Dolls, Hey Arnold!, CBS Morning News, and has been a guest host for E!. She has presented the Daytime Emmy Awards, the Soap Opera Digest Awards, and was awarded "Best Newcomer on a Daytime Television Show" in Australia. She was also named one of the "Fifty most Beautiful People" on television by Soap Opera Digest and Soap Opera Weekly. She has also starred in eight films during her career, including; The Skulls II, Lord of Illusions playing  Famke Janssen's younger self, and Mr. Murder with Stephen Baldwin, Thomas Haden Church, and James Coburn.

Modeling
As a model Ashley Tesoro has worked for companies such as Radiosa Gowns, Levi's and Tommy Hilfiger. She has starred in commercial ads, and has been featured on the cover of magazines such as; Teen (Teen Beauty Guide), Soap Opera Digest, Soap Opera Weekly, CBS Soaps In Depth, and Cross Point.

Music
While starring on The Bold and the Beautiful, executive-producer Bradley Bell incorporated singing into her character of Kimberly Fairchild. She recorded several original songs and music videos for the show. One of these songs was premiered on KIIS-FM's Valentine Show. In 2007, Ashley Tesoro made her country music debut with a self-titled EP on Tesoro Records. The album was produced by Ron Aniello, mixed by Mike Shipley, and mastered by Joe Gastwirt. Larry Eagle, drummer and percussionist on Bruce Springsteen's We Shall Overcome: The Seeger Sessions, played drums on two of the EP's tracks. In 2010, she released her second EP on Tesoro Records titled Oh You Angel. This country gospel album was produced by Ron Aniello, mixed by Clif Norrell, and mastered by Joe Gastwirt. In August 2010, Ashley Tesoro opened for Jackson Browne at a private event in Santa Barbara, California. Supported by the Abiders she performed the song "Heaven Let Me Know" from her EP Oh You Angel. In 2012, she released her third EP on Tesoro Records titled Simply Worship. This A cappella and acoustic gospel album was produced by Ron Aniello and mixed and mastered by Alec Dixon.

Personal life 
Tesoro graduated "with honors" from the University of Phoenix. She earned degrees in psychology and communication/culture & communication.

Ashley Tesoro grew up singing in church and performing in the theater company Christian Youth Theater. She and her husband Anthony are both Christian ministers, and run the Tesoro Ministry Foundation, a non-profit charity-ministry foundation founded by Anthony in 2000. She is the co-writer of Life Is For Living; a Christian ministry and lifestyle blog, and the co-host of Life Is For Living TV a Christian ministry and lifestyle web series.

Ashley enjoys training in the martial arts and has earned red belts in Combat Karate and American Tang Soo Do from her husband Anthony Tesoro who is a lifelong martial artist and former karate instructor. She has trained in boxing, kickboxing, Karate, Tang Soo Do, and grappling.

Marriage and family 
On September 30, 2001, Ashley Cafagna married Anthony Tesoro, a Christian minister. Anthony formerly worked on Wall Street for Paine Webber and then Jones Institutional Trading Services before entering the non-profit sector and founding ministry/charity organization the Tesoro Ministry Foundation, Inc. in 2000. In 2005, Ashley and her husband Anthony founded Tesoro Entertainment, a production company; and in 2007, they launched Tesoro Entertainment's music label division, Tesoro Records; with the Christian music sub-label Sacred Music launching in 2012. Their daughter, Gabriella Lyn, was born on November 18, 2013; and their son Anthony John, was born December 24, 2015.

Discography

Albums

Singles

Music videos

Filmography

Film

Television

Honors and awards

Honors
 The Honorable Order of Kentucky Colonels
 2009 - Honorary Kentucky Colonel for service and contributions to the global community - honoree
 Soap Opera Digest
 1999 - Soap Opera's 50 Most Beautiful People - recipient
 Soap Opera Weekly
 1999 - Soap Opera's 50 Most Beautiful People - recipient

Awards
 Young Artist Awards
 2002 - Best Performance in a TV Drama Series - Leading Young Actress for The Bold and the Beautiful - nominated
 2001 - Best Performance in a Daytime TV Series - Young Actress for The Bold and the Beautiful - nominated
 2000 - Best Performance in a TV Comedy Series - Supporting Young Actress for Saved by the Bell: The New Class - nominated
 YoungStar Awards (The Hollywood Reporter's Annual YoungStar Awards)
 2000 - Best Young Actress/Performance in a Saturday Morning TV Series for Saved by the Bell: The New Class - nominated
 2000 - Best Young Actress/Performance in a Daytime TV Series for The Bold and the Beautiful - nominated
 1999 - Best Performance by a Young Actress in a Saturday Morning TV Program for Saved by the Bell: The New Class - nominated
 1999 - Best Performance by a Young Actress in a Daytime TV Program for The Bold and the Beautiful - nominated
 Inside Soap Awards
 1999 - Best Newcomer for The Bold and the Beautiful - winner

References

External links

Ashley Tesoro | The Official Website

1983 births
Actresses from Iowa
American child actresses
American women country singers
American country singer-songwriters
American people of Italian descent
American film actresses
American performers of Christian music
American soap opera actresses
American television actresses
Living people
Actors from Davenport, Iowa
People from Escondido, California
Singer-songwriters from California
21st-century American singers
21st-century American women singers
Country musicians from California
Singer-songwriters from Iowa